The Honourable Artillery Company (HAC) is a reserve regiment in the British Army. Incorporated by royal charter in 1537 by King Henry VIII, it is the oldest regiment in the British Army and is considered the second-oldest military unit in the world. Today, it is also a charity whose purpose is to attend to the "better defence of the realm", primarily through supporting the HAC regiment and a detachment of City of London Special Constabulary. The word "artillery" in "Honourable Artillery Company" does not have the current meaning that is generally associated with it, but dates from a time when in the English language that word meant any projectile, including for example arrows shot from a bow. The equivalent form of words in modern English would be either "Honourable Infantry Company" or "Honourable Military Company".

In the 17th century, its members played a significant part in the formation of both the Royal Marines and the Grenadier Guards. More recently, regiments, battalions and batteries of the Company fought with distinction in both World Wars and its current Regiment, which forms part of the Army Reserve, is the oldest surviving regiment in the British Army, and the second most senior in the Army Reserve after the Royal Monmouthshire Royal Engineers (Militia). Members of the Regiment and Specials are drawn, for the most part, from young men and women working in and around the City and Greater London. Those leaving the active units may become Veteran Members and remain within the fraternity of the Company.

History

Early history

The HAC can trace its history back as far as 1087, but it received a royal charter from Henry VIII on 25 August 1537, when Letters Patent were received by the Overseers of the Fraternity or Guild of St George authorising them to establish a perpetual corporation for the defence of the realm to be known as the Fraternity or Guild of Artillery of Longbows, Crossbows and Handgonnes. This body was known by a variety of names until 1658, when it was first referred to as the Artillery Company. It was first referred to as the Honourable Artillery Company in 1685 and officially received the name from Queen Victoria in 1860. However, the Archers’ Company of the Honourable Artillery Company was retained into the late 19th century, though as a private club. Founded in 1781 by Sir Ashton Lever, it met at Archers’ Hall, Inner Circle, Regent's Park, London. The Archers' Company remained a part of the regiment operated from 1784 to the late 1790s, along with Matross, Grenadier (established on 11 August 1686) and Light Infantry companies/divisions, with a Rifle or Yager Company introduced around 1803.

The regiment has the rare distinction of having fought on the side of both Parliament and the Royalists during the English Civil War 1642 to 1649.

From its formation, the company trained at a site it had occupied at the Old Artillery Ground in Spitalfields and at The Merchant Taylors' Company Hall. In 1622, the company built its first Armoury House at the site of the Old Artillery Gardens.

In 1638, Sir Maurice Abbot granted the company use of lands at its current site south of Bunhill Fields Burial Ground on City Road, which in 1649 consisted of twelve acres enclosed by a brick wall and pale. In 1657, it sold its old Armoury House in Spitalfield to Master Gunner Richard Woolaston for £300.

In 1656, the Grenadier Guards were formed from gentlemen of the Honourable Artillery Company who had taken the then heir to the throne, Prince Charles (later Charles II), to Europe for his safety during the English Civil War.

In 28 October 1664, in the New Artillery Gardens, the body of men that would become the Royal Marines was first formed with an initial strength of 1,200 infantrymen recruited from the London Trained Bands as part of the mobilisation for the Second Anglo-Dutch War. James (later King James VII & II), the Duke of York and Albany, Lord High Admiral and brother of King Charles II, was Captain-General of the Honourable Artillery Company, the unit that trained the Trained Bands.

The Company served in Broadgate during the Gordon Riots of 1780 and in gratitude for its role in restoring order to the City, the Corporation of London presented "two brass field-pieces", which led to the creation of an HAC Artillery Division. (These guns are on display in the entrance hall of Armoury House.)

In 1860, control of the Company moved from the Home Office to the War Office and in 1889, a Royal Warrant gave the Secretary of State for War control of the Company's military affairs. In 1883, Queen Victoria decreed that the HAC took precedence next after the Regular Forces and therefore before the Militia and Yeomanry in consideration of its antiquity.

South Africa 1900–02
Members of the Company first served as a formed unit overseas in the South African War (1899–1902). Almost two hundred members served; the majority in the City of London Imperial Volunteers (CIV) as infantry, mounted infantry and in a Field Battery that was officered, and for the most part manned, by members of the Company.

Territorial and Reserve Forces Act 1907
In 1907, the Company became part of the newly formed Territorial Force with the passing of the Territorial and Reserve Forces Act. The HAC Infantry was due to become part of the newly formed London Regiment as the "26th (County of London) Battalion" but instead managed to retain its own identity as the Honourable Artillery Company Infantry Battalion. The HAC also had its property and privileges protected by the Honourable Artillery Company Act 1908.

First World War

The HAC expanded to three infantry battalions and seven artillery batteries during the First World War. Second Lieutenants Reginald Leonard Haine and Alfred Oliver Pollard, of the 1st Battalion HAC, were awarded Victoria Crosses for their actions at Gavrelle in 1917. In total 1,650 men from the HAC were killed during the war.

In September 1914, the 1st Battalion followed the British Expeditionary Force to France and fought in the 1st Battle of Ypres. After the fighting at the Battle of the Ancre in 1916 and the Battle of Arras in 1917, it became an officer training battalion and provided demonstration platoons. Elements of the battalion were used to help quell the Étaples Mutiny. The 2nd Battalion HAC was raised in August 1914; it was in France by October 1916 and in action on 25 February 1917 at Bucquoy. They fought at the Battle of Arras in May and the 3rd Battle of Ypres in October. In November 1917, the battalion moved to the Italian Front under the command of Lieutenant-Colonel Richard O’Connor. In the Battle of Vittorio Veneto, in October 1918, they led a force of Italians, Americans and British that compelled the garrison of the strategic island of Papadopoli (in the main channel of the River Piave) to surrender. For this remarkable feat of arms, the HAC was awarded two Distinguished Service Orders, five Military Crosses, three Distinguished Conduct Medals and 29 Military Medals.

Both A Battery and B Battery went to Suez in April 1915. In July, B Battery fought in the recapture of Sheikh Othman (key to the water supply to Aden) from the Turks as part of the Aden campaign. In February 1917, both batteries took part in the Palestine Campaign, were in action at the First and Second Battle of Gaza and entered Jerusalem in December 1917. In the German counter-attack during the Second action of Es Salt on 1 May 1918, A Battery was forced to make a rapid withdrawal under heavy fire, which resulted in the loss of all its guns. Both A and B Batteries took part in the Battle of Megiddo in September.

The 2nd Line batteries – 2/A Battery and 2/B Battery – were formed in 1914 and served on the Western Front in 1917 and 1918 as part of an Army Field Artillery Brigade; the 3rd Line batteries – A (Reserve) Battery and B (Reserve) Battery – were formed in 1915 to provide trained replacements for the 1st and 2nd Line batteries.

A seventh battery, the 309th (HAC) Siege Battery RGA, went to France in April 1917 and saw action at the Battle of Messines and the Battle of Amiens.

In 1919, Lieutenant-Colonel Edward Lisle Strutt, arranged for a detachment of the 2nd Battalion to form a Guard of Honour at Imst Station to give a final Royal Salute on the departure of the Imperial State Train for Charles I, the last Austro-Hungarian Emperor-King, to safety in Switzerland, after having served as the family's protector at Eckartsau on the personal initiative of King George V.

Interwar
When the Territorial Force was reconstituted as the Territorial Army (TA) in 1920, the HAC infantry battalion was reformed, while A and B Batteries formed a composite RHA unit with the City of London Yeomanry (Rough Riders) (one battery) as 11th (HAC and City of London Yeomanry) Brigade, RHA. The TA began to expand rapidly at the time of the Munich Crisis in 1938, and the Yeomanry left to form a separate light anti-aircraft regiment leaving 11th Regiment RHA (HAC). Subsequently, the HAC formed the 12th (1939) and 13th Regiments RHA (HAC) (1940) and the 86th (HAC) Heavy Anti-Aircraft Regiment (1939).

Second World War

Infantry Battalion
In 1939, the Infantry Battalion became 162 (HAC) Officer Cadet Training Unit, this was the Officer Training Unit of the Reconnaissance Corps. In 1942, 101 RAC OCTU amalgamated with 162 Reconnaissance Corps OCTU to form 100 RAC OCTU based at the Royal Military College, Sandhurst.

11th (HAC) Regiment, RHA
The 11th (HAC) Regiment RHA served in North Africa at the Battle of Knightsbridge with 25-pounder guns and, after re-equipping with the M7 Priest self-propelled gun, in the Second Battle of El Alamein where it was commanded by Bill Leggatt. The regiment's guns were the first guns ashore in the invasion of Sicily; then they took part in the Allied invasion of Italy and the Italian Campaign.

12th (HAC) Regiment, RHA
The 12th (HAC) Regiment RHA took part in the Operation Torch landings and were in action at Thala in February 1943, where they halted a German advance following the Battle of the Kasserine Pass. After re-equipping with Priests, they too moved on to Italy in March 1944 and fought at Monte Cassino.

13th (HAC) Regiment, RHA
The 13th (HAC) Regiment RHA equipped with Sexton self-propelled guns fought in Normandy, the Netherlands and across the Rhine into Germany as part of 11th Armoured Division.

86th (HAC) HAA Regiment, RA
See main article: 86th (Honourable Artillery Company) Heavy Anti-Aircraft Regiment, Royal Artillery
The regiment formed part of 26th (London) Anti-Aircraft Brigade defending the London Inner Artillery Zone. Anti-Aircraft Command mobilised on 24 August 1939, and so 86th (HAC) HAA Rgt was already manning static gunsites at places like Primrose Hill and Finsbury Park when war was declared on 3 September. The regiment served in the defence of the capital throughout The Blitz. It became a mobile unit in 1942 and was one of the first units to land on D-Day, with Regimental Headquarters commanding a composite AA Assault Group on Juno Beach. During the Normandy Campaign and subsequent advance into Belgium the regiment's 3.7-inch HAA guns were sometimes used to engage ground targets. During the winter of 1944–45 its guns and radar defended Brussels and Antwerp against V-1 flying bombs (known as 'Divers').

Over seven hundred members of the Company lost their lives during the Second World War.

Post-war
In 1947, the Company was reorganised into:
an Infantry Battalion
1st Regiment HAC, RHA, of self-propelled Artillery (from 11th (HAC) RHA Regiment)
2nd Regiment HAC, (HAA) of heavy Anti-Aircraft Artillery (from 86th (HAC) HAA Regiment; disbanded 1955)
G Locating Battery (from 12th (HAC) RHA Regiment; disbanded 1961)

In 1973, the Regiment was again reorganised; it was given the role of providing 'Stay Behind' Observation Posts (OPs) for the British Army of the Rhine as one of the three Territorial Army units making up the Corps Patrol Unit (with 21 and 23 SAS). 
The three sabre squadrons, each with a number of four to six man patrols provided surveillance and target acquisition capabilities to the HQs of 1st Artillery Brigade (HQ Sqn HAC), 1 Armoured Division (I Sqn HAC), 4 Armoured Division (II Sqn HAC), and 1 BR Corps (III Sqn HAC) with one ‘sabre’ squadron each.
The new structure was:
Three patrol squadrons (1, 2 and 3 or I, II and III) – a fourth patrol squadron was formed for a short period in the 1980s
Headquarter Squadron, including Training Wing and Medical Wing
The Gun Troop (a battery of six 25 pounder guns and not part of the OP role)
Band
Corps of Drums

In 1992, the signals troops that had been integrated into the patrol squadrons were brought together to form the Signal Squadron; they were subsequently re-integrated with the patrol squadrons in 2010.

In 1992, on Salisbury Plain, the HAC was the last British Army unit to fire the 25-pounder in the field, as the Gun Troop retrained onto the 105mm Light Gun. The 25 pounder continued to be fired ceremonially until it was replaced by the Light Gun.

In 1996, the first formed unit of the Regiment to be mobilised for active service since the Second World War was called up for Operation Resolute with the NATO IFOR in Bosnia.

The Regiment participated in the celebration of HM The Queen's Golden Jubilee on 4 June 2002 by firing a 62 gun salute at the Tower of London, and by providing a Guard of Honour (including the Regimental Band and the Massed Corps of Drums of the 1st Bn Grenadier Guards and the HAC) at St Paul's Cathedral. In December of that year, the Captain-General visited and dined with the company to commemorate her Golden Jubilee as Captain-General.

In 2005, the guns were withdrawn from Gun Troop, which was renamed Liaison Troop.

In 2006, the HAC was the first major unit of the Territorial Army to convert to the Bowman communications system. When Bowman was temporarily withdrawn from the Territorial Army in 2008/9, it was one of the few units to retain the equipment.

In 2016, Queen Elizabeth II became the longest-serving Captain-General of the HAC, with 64 years of service.

In 2017 A Battery (1st City of London) Honourable Artillery Company, was re-formed to provide gunners in support of 7th Parachute Regiment Royal Horse Artillery.

Current role and organisation

Current role

The main role of the regiment is surveillance and target acquisition, and the provision of parachute gunners in support of 16 Air Assault Brigade.

The HAC has a ceremonial role in providing guards of honour at the Guildhall in the City of London during state visits and, since 1924 (when the Royal Artillery ceased to be stationed at the Tower), has provided the saluting battery at the Tower of London for state occasions.

Training

The HAC is one of only a small number of Army Reserve units with responsibility for the carrying out portions of Phase One (recruits) and Two training of its own soldiers 'in house'. The Phase One course comprises six HAC-only weekends, followed by a two-week training period with other reserve soldiers at Army Training Centre Pirbright. Unlike most Army Reserve units, who are only required to train at up to sub-unit (company or squadron) level, the HAC is required to train as a regiment.

Those who wish to serve in 1 Squadron are required to undertake the Surveillance and Reconnaissance Patrols Course (SRPC), an arduous course with only a 10% pass rate. Service as a Special Observer qualifies for additional pay and specialist courses and is open to all arms and services.

Organisation
The HAC is not part of the Royal Regiment of Artillery, being an older and separate regiment with its own uniform, insignia and colours. The regiment forms part of 77 Brigade (having previously been part of 1st Intelligence Surveillance and Reconnaissance Brigade) with sub units supporting the Army Special Operations Brigade and 16 Air Assault Brigade Combat Team. The sub units of the HAC are:
Headquarters Squadron.
The Corps of Drums. The last remaining sub-unit from the infantry battalions and still wearing the grenade beret badge, Foot Guards belt, beret badge backing and tactical recognition flash. As with an infantry battalion corps of drums, the drummers are 'soldiers first' and regularly deploy soldiers on operations as well as fulfilling their ceremonial role. The Corps of Drums forms part of HQ Squadron and is a separate entity from the Band, who are primarily musicians. They provide personnel for A Battery whilst still maintaining their ceremonial drumming role.
The Medical Wing, commanded by the Surgeon Major, who is a Royal Army Medical Corps officer, provides medical support to the Regiment for peacetime training and on deployment. Combat medical technicians within the Medical Wing undergo additional specialist medical training with the Defence Medical Services.
 CIS Troop, a troop to provide communications information systems capability to the HAC and other units.
 Sicily Troop. The enablers of the Regiment, providing logistics and motorised capability to the HAC and other units.
 A (1st City of London) Battery, Honourable Artillery Company, a battery of 105mm light guns. The battery is paired with 7th Parachute Regiment Royal Horse Artillery.
 1 Squadron, comprising two troops of surveillance and reconnaissance patrols. 1 Squadron provides long-range surveillance, reconnaissance and a joint-fires capability as formed surveillance and target acquisition patrols to support the Army Special Operations Brigade, following the Integrated Review, 2021.
 2 Squadron, composed of a squadron headquarters, and three troops (Knightsbridge, El Hamma and El Alamein) of light ISR Detachments.
 III Squadron, composed of a squadron headquarters, and three troops (Aden, Gaza and Rhine) of light ISR Detachments.

Future Soldier programme: under this programme the HAC was moved to 77th Brigade.  A Battery will provide two guns to each battery of 7 (Para) RHA and 1 Squadron will provide Special Patrols to the Army Special Operations Brigade.

Operations
The Regiment has had individuals or sub-units on active service at all times since 1996; with the personnel serving in a wide variety of roles in Northern Ireland, Bosnia, Kosovo, Iraq, Afghanistan and various countries in Africa. Commitments included the deployment of individuals to human intelligence roles in the Balkans (including as part of Joint Commission Observer teams) and then formed patrols to Bosnia, Kosovo and Iraq; independent sub-units to Operation Telic 4 and 5 in Iraq and L Troop to Operation Telic 9; as well as individual and group reinforcements to other infantry and artillery units. In Afghanistan deployed personnel were divided between operating and maintaining counter indirect fire systems and other high technology equipment and forming part of the Brigade Reconnaissance Force (BRF).

On Tuesday 4 December 2007, Trooper Jack Sadler, who was serving with the BRF, was killed when his vehicle was hit by a blast north of Sangin, in Helmand province. Two other soldiers were injured in the attack. In 2008, the Runner-up for the Cobra Trophy for Volunteer Reservist of the year was Trooper Adam Cocks of 2 Squadron, who was severely injured in Afghanistan when his vehicle struck a mine. While recuperating at Headley Court rehabilitation centre, he and a friend came up with the idea of a rugby match at Twickenham to help raise money for the charity Help for Heroes.

Regimental museum
The Honourable Artillery Company Museum is located at Armoury House.

Dress
In 1830, King William IV ordered that the uniform of the HAC should be based on that of the Grenadier Guards, except that where the Grenadiers wear gold, the HAC were to wear silver. This tradition is continued today by the wearing of the silver coloured grenade in the forage cap similar to the brass one of the Grenadiers, and the buttons and lace on HAC dress uniforms being silver coloured instead of gold.

Berets
The HAC wear a khaki beret with the HAC's beret badge ("short arms") in white metal on a black backing. Officers and warrant officers wear an embroidered cloth version of the same badge. The Corps of Drums and Regimental Band wear the HAC infantry grenade on a blue red blue backing, which is superficially identical to that of the Grenadier Guards. From July 2008, members of 4/73 (Sphinx) Special OP Battery, part of 5th Regiment Royal Artillery, the HACs paired regular regiment, adopted the khaki beret to mark their close working relationship.

Other headdress

On the forage cap, the HAC infantry grenade (white metal) is worn by junior ranks of all subunits of the regiment. Sergeants and Warrant Officers wear a different version of the grenade, which has the letters HAC in brass on the ball of the grenade. Officers wear an embroidered silver grenade on their forage caps in No 1 Dress (Infantry) and on the Service Dress forage cap but when in No 1 Dress (Gunner) they wear the HAC Artillery cap badge. The latter is similar to that of the Royal Artillery but with "HAC" and "Arma Pacis Fulcra" replacing "Ubique" and "Quo Fas et Gloria Ducunt". In Full Dress (normally only worn by the Band and Corps of Drums), the Bearskin is worn without a plume.

Badges of rank

In No 2 dress, Soldiers wear the larger Foot Guards badges of rank and qualification. Lance Corporals wear two chevrons and Lance Sergeants three. In Full Dress and Number 1 dress, WO2's wear a large colour badge of the same pattern as the Grenadier Guards, but in silver rather than gold. Officers' crowns and stars are of the same pattern as those of the Grenadiers (Order of the Garter), woven for combat uniforms but in silver for Service and Barrack Dress.

Stable belts

Each Squadron wears a different stable belt:

A (City of London) Battery – Light blue with narrow yellow stripe through the middle. ( Identical to the Royal Horse Artillery) 
Headquarter Squadron and Band – red and blue edged with narrow yellow stripes
I Squadron – red
II Squadron – green (Identical to that worn by The Rifles)
III Squadron – blue
Training Wing – black
Corps of Drums – blue red blue (Identical to that worn by the Foot Guards)

Other distinctions

In 1906, King Edward VII gave the HAC the distinction of a special ribbon for the Volunteer Officers' Decoration and Volunteer Long Service Medal. The ribbon, based on The King's personal colours (in turn taken from the Royal Standard), is red and blue edged with narrow yellow stripes. This ribbon has been carried forward to subsequent Territorial long service medals awarded to HAC members.

B Battery HAC supported the 10th Hussars during the Second World War and, in 1972, the Captain General approved the Battery wearing a 10th Hussar button as the top button on Numbers 1, 2 and 10 dress. This privilege is carried on by Number II Squadron following the 1973 re-organisation.

Each year the Captain General awards a prize to the member of the Regiment who is deemed to have made an outstanding contribution to the Regiment. Holders of this prize, known as the King's or Queen's Prize wear a badge incorporating the Captain General's cypher and the year of award on Numbers 1, 2, 10 and 13 Dress.

Coat of arms

The coat of arms of the company is a Shield of Arms, helm, mantling and crest with as supporters a Pikeman and a Musketeer and the motto 'Arma Pacis Fulcra', Unlike other regiments of the British Army, the HAC is incorporated and is therefore eligible to bear and use a Coat of arms. It is believed to date from circa 1615 and the coat of arms appears on a military manual published in 1629.

Battle honours
The regiment's battle honours are as follows:

 South Africa 1900–02.
 The Great War (3 Bns and 7 Btys): Ypres 1915 '17, Somme 1916 '18, Ancre Heights, Ancre 1916, Arras 1917 '18, Scarpe 1917 '18, Arleux, Bullecourt, Pilckem, Polygon Wood, Broodseinde, Poelcappelle, Passchendaele, Amiens, Albert 1918, Bapaume 1918, Drocourt-Quéant, Hindenburg Line, Épèhy, St. Quentin Canal, Cambrai 1918, Selle, Sambre, France and Flanders 1914–18, Piave, Vittorio Veneto, Italy 1917–18, Rafah, Egypt 1915–17, Gaza, El Mughar, Jerusalem, Jordan, Megiddo, Sharon, Damascus, Palestine 1917–18, Aden.
The Second World War: Bourguébus Ridge, Antwerp, Le Havre, Rhine, North-West Europe 1944–45, Knightsbridge, El Alamein, El Hamma, Sbiba, Thala, Tunis, North Africa 1941–43, Sicily 1943, Cassino II, Coriano, Senio, Italy 1944–45.

The battle honours listed were awarded for services of both infantry and artillery units of the HAC. Those in bold are borne on the Colours.

Colours
The HAC is unique within the British Army in having two types of Colours. The HAC has its ceremonial Guns (which are considered Colours in Artillery regiments), but also carries a stand of traditional Colours of the Infantry. These Colours follow the pattern of line infantry regiments: the Queen's Colour being a version of the Union Flag, the Regimental Colour being blue with the HAC Coat of Arms in the centre. The last four occasions that new Colours have been presented to the Regiment were in 1928 by Edward, Prince of Wales (later Edward VIII), and in 1955, 1980 and on 18 May 2007 by HM Queen Elizabeth II, the regiment's Captain General.

City of London Police Special Constabulary
In 1919, following a decision to increase the strength of the Metropolitan Police Reserve Force, the Home Secretary approached the HAC to form a Division of Special Constabulary. Some 150 members, mostly Great War veterans, rallied to the call and joined the Division, forming the HAC Detachment. At the outbreak of the Second World War, the Detachment was integrated into G Division of the Metropolitan Police and then later with Islington Division. Following reorganisation, the Detachment is now part of the City of London Police Special Constabulary, its administrative base is Armoury House.
 
In 2010, the Ferrers Trophy was awarded to Special Constable Patrick Rarden of the detachment for using his banking skills and experience to help train colleagues and provide invaluable assistance to solve fraud cases.

"The Company"

As well as the Army Reserve Regiment and Specials (the "Active Units"), the HAC exists as a separate charitable organisation—often colloquially referred to as "The Company" or "The House". The Company owns Armoury House and the Regiment's current grounds and, in addition to supporting the Active Unit, provides the basis for a social calendar. There are two distinct classes of member of the Company. The first, Regimental Members, are those who are currently serving or who have previously served in the HAC Regiment or City of London Special Constabulary. The second, Members, must have served at least two years in Regular or three years in Volunteer units of the Crown or in the Police. Some members are people who have reached senior rank (for example Major General The Duke of Westminster) and they provide some 17% of the overall membership of the Company.

Since 1633, the Company has been governed by a Court of Assistants, like many of the City Livery Companies. The first Court for which a record can be found was held in January 1657.

Pikemen and Musketeers

The Pikemen and Musketeers (formed 1925, given a Royal Warrant 1955) are made up of veteran members of the Active Units. They are the personal bodyguard of the Lord Mayor of the City of London and form his Guard on ceremonial occasions.

Light Cavalry

The Light Cavalry Troop (formed 1979, granted Royal Warrant 2004) is open to both Regimental and Non-Regimental members of the Company. They escort the Lady Mayoress, and in particular provide her 'Travelling Escort' at the Lord Mayor's Show.

Grounds

Site
From 1538 to 1658, the HAC occupied and trained at the Old Artillery Ground in Spitalfields on the site of the outer precinct of the dissolved Priory and Hospital of St Mary Spital. In 1658, following disputes over use of the Ground with the Gunners of the Tower, it moved to its current site south of the Bunhill Fields Burial Ground continuing to the south as far as Chiswell Street. This area is described in a map of the area of 1677 as the 'New Artillery Garden' and has variously been referred to as the Artillery Ground and the Artillery Garden. This current site now falls in the London Borough of Islington, and is just north of the City of London, the main entrance being in City Road. During the aftermath of the 7 July 2005 London bombings on the London transport system, the Artillery Garden was used as a temporary mortuary.

Armoury House

Armoury House stands at the north of these grounds, and is the home of the HAC. It was built to replace a smaller 17th-century armoury; the central portion being completed in 1735 to designs by Thomas Stibbs financed in part by a gift of £500 from King George I. Subscriptions were received from members of the Company and from the Court of Lieutenancy for the City of London. The building cost £1,332.

In 1802, a distinctive flag tower was added to the roof. The East and West Wings were built in 1828, replacing much smaller buildings on either side of Armoury House. A cottage, originally for the Sergeant Major, was built against the West Wing in 1850. 1862 saw the completion of a Victorian drill hall attached to the rear. The Albert Room, as it was called, featured an iron trussed roof and was named in honour of the then recently deceased Prince Albert.

On 9 June 1990, the hall was bombed by the Provisional IRA whilst a 21st birthday party was in progress, injuring 17 civilians.

In recent years parts of the building have been available on a private hire basis for events.

Finsbury Barracks

Finsbury Barracks is the Regiment's Headquarters and is leased by London RFCA from the HAC itself. Completed for the Royal London Militia in 1857, it was designed by the architect Joseph Jennings and built in Kentish Ragstone. An extension, faced in striped stone and granite, linking Finsbury Barracks to Armoury House was designed by Arnold & Boston and added in 1994. Finsbury Barracks was refurbished in the same year and was re-opened by the Captain General in 1996.

The HAC Shooting Lodge / "Bisley Hut"

The lodge was built in 1928 on land leased from the National Rifle Association at Bisley and replaced the original hut on the site. The building was funded by donations, including some in memory of the fallen of the First World War.  HAC vacated the lodge in 2012 following the expiry of their lease and now affiliates to the London & Middlesex Rifle Association.

Pencelli Estate
In 1999, the Company acquired the Welsh Pencelli Estate near Brecon as an area that could be used by the Regiment for military and adventure training. The historic estate lies in the heart of the Brecon Beacons National Park and comprises approximately 14,000 acres (57 km²) of hill land.

Notable members of the HAC

Colonels Commandant
Colonel the Earl of Denbigh (1903–1933)
Colonel the Viscount Galway (1933–1935)
Colonel the Earl Fortescue (1935–1943)
Field Marshal Viscount Gort (1943–1946)
Field Marshal Alan Brooke, 1st Viscount Alanbrooke (1946–1954)
Major General Sir Julian Gascoigne (1954–1959)
 General Sir Richard Goodbody (1959–1966)
 General Sir Rodney Moore (1966–1976)
 General Sir Victor FitzGeorge-Balfour (1976–1984)
 General Sir Richard Trant (1984–1992)
 General Sir Michael Wilkes (1992–1998)
 General Sir Alexander Harley (1998–2003)
 General Sir Timothy Granville-Chapman (2003–2010)
 Lieutenant General Sir Barney White-Spunner (2010–2013)
General Sir Richard Barrons (2013–2019)
General Sir Patrick Sanders (2019–)
Others
 Major Tom Addington, an outstanding all-rounder: sportsman, Commando, paratrooper and horse gunner, he was awarded an MC in the Netherlands.
Jock Airlie (Seton), Association Football Player
Kevin Alderton, holder of the blind speed ski world record
Edward John Amoore, Olympic Gold and Bronze medalist for shooting at 1908 Olympics
Major General Dennis Beckett CB DSO OBE awarded a DSO at the Battle of Monte Cassino
Prince Rupert of the Rhine
George Monck, 1st Duke of Albemarle
Gregory Barker, MP
 Nigel Bruce, actor. Served with the Regiment 1914-1915.
 Bertram Bowyer, 2nd Baron Denham, KBE, PC (3 October 1927 – 1 December 2021), a British Conservative politician, hereditary peer, writer and former member of the House of Lords. He was one of the few people to serve in the governments of five different Prime Ministers.
 Major Robert Cain VC TD (2 January 1909 – 2 May 1974)
 Sir James Carreras, British film producer, who, together with William Hinds, founded the legendary British film company Hammer Film Productions.
 Leo Cooper, publisher
 John Laurie, actor
 Edward Leigh MP
 Charles Greenwood, HAC before joining regular artillery, earned MC at Monte Cassino
Sir Edward Heath, former Prime Minister
 Colonel Robert Dow Hunter – Army officer who knocked out two Tiger tanks in Germany
LGen Andrew Leslie OMM, MSC, MSM, CD, former Chief of Land Staff, Canadian Forces
 Major David Liddell MC
 Guy Liddell CB MBE MC, Deputy-Director-General MI5, One of Britain's principal wartime spymasters.
 Gilbert McMicking CMG Scottish Liberal Party politician.
Vincenzo Lunardi, honorary member
General Sir Richard O'Connor, KT, GCB, DSO, MC, ADC
Richard Owen, English biologist, comparative anatomist and palaeontologist.
Kenneth Powell, Olympic hurdler
 Hugh Pritchard (Olympic biathlete 2002 games)
Prince Henry, Duke of Gloucester
 Sir Marmaduke Roydon (1583 – 28 April 1646) an English merchant-adventurer and colonial planter, known also as a Royalist army officer.
 Patrick Shovelton, one of Whitehall's most formidable international negotiators
 John Talbot, awarded the MC in Normandy in 1944.
John Venn an English politician who sat in the House of Commons from 1641 to 1650. He was one of the regicides of King Charles I.
Sir Albert Lambert Ward, 1st Baronet  Conservative Party politician.
Basil Williams, historian
 Evelyn Maitland "Lyn" Wellings (6 April 1909 – 10 September 1992) Egyptian-born English cricketer and journalist, who played for Oxford University and Surrey.

Affiliations
 – Sandfontein Artillery Regiment
 – Ancient and Honorable Artillery Company of Massachusetts

Schools affiliation
In 1995, six public schools (Eton, Harrow, Marlborough, Radley, Rugby and Wellington) became affiliated to the Company. The rationale behind these affiliations is to facilitate communication with the schools and to inform students of the opportunities available to them within the HAC.

Cadet force
The HAC established a Cadet Battalion in 1942 during the Second World War which continued until 1958. During the War and until 1948 members of the Cadet Battalion fired salutes and provided guards of honour whilst members of the HAC were away on active service. In 2012, the HAC sponsored and helped establish a cadet unit at the City of London Academy Islington and, in 2018, another at Mossbourne Community Academy.

See also 

 Honourable Artillery Company Museum
 Transvaal Horse Artillery
 Ancient and Honorable Artillery Company of Massachusetts

Order of precedence

References
Notes

Citations

Sources

Sources

Further reading

External links

 Honourable Artillery Company on the British Army website.
 The "Company" website
 The Light Cavalry HAC website
 The HAC Pikemen & Musketeers
 Newsreel showing the Earl of Athlone inspecting the HAC Horse Artillery in 1932.
 Newsreel of the Queen presenting new HAC Colours in 1955. The final part of the clip demonstrates the unique regimental custom of toasting or cheering a member of the Company with "Regimental Fire".
 Newsreel of HAC infantry on exercise and of the Pikemen in 1958

 
1537 establishments in England
Military units and formations established in 1537
Regiments of the British Army
British ceremonial units
Bodyguards
Army Reserve (United Kingdom)
TAVR regiments of the Royal Artillery
Regiments of the British Army in World War I
Infantry regiments of the British Army
Organisations based in London with royal patronage
Military units and formations in London
Artillery units and formations of the British Army
History of the Royal Marines
Military units and formations of the United Kingdom in the War in Afghanistan (2001–2021)
Army reconnaissance units and formations
Regiments of the British Army in World War II
Henry VIII